BC Valga-Valka, also known as BC Valga-Valka/Maks & Moorits for sponsorship reasons, is a basketball club representing the twin towns of Valga, Estonia and Valka, Latvia. The team plays in the Latvian–Estonian Basketball League. Their home arena is the Valga Sports Hall. From 2015 to 2018 the team uniquely competed in both Estonian and Latvian domestic top leagues.

History
Valga Korvpallikool (Valga Basketball School) was founded in 2001. In 2006, the team won the third tier II Liiga and was promoted to the top tier Korvpalli Meistriliiga (KML). Valga finished the 2006–07 regular season in eighth place and advanced to the playoffs, where they were defeated in the quarterfinals by eventual champions University of Tartu, losing the series 0–2.

Valga finished the 2008–09 regular season in fourth place. In the playoffs, Valga defeated Tallinna Kalev in the quarterfinals, winning the series 3–2, but were swept by University of Tartu in the semifinals. The team faced TTÜ in the third place games, losing the series 0–2 and placing fourth in the final standings. Valga also made their debut in the Baltic Basketball League (BBL) in the 2008–09 season, but failed to advance past the group stage of the Challenge Cup competition.

In July 2015, it was announced that Valga will join the Latvian Basketball League (LBL) for the 2015–16 season, thus becoming the first club to simultaneously compete in both the Estonian and the Latvian League. Valga finished the 2015–16 regular season in sixth place. In the playoffs, the team faced VEF Rīga in the quarterfinals and lost the series 0–3.

Sponsorship naming
Valga has had several denominations through the years due to its sponsorship:

Valga Welg/Kolmvedu: 2005–2006
Valga Welg: 2006–2008
Valga/CKE Inkasso: 2009–2011
BC Valga/Maks & Moorits: 2012–2015
BC Valga-Valka/Maks & Moorits: 2015–present

Home arena
Valga Sports Hall (2005–present)

Players

Current roster

Depth chart

Coaches

Jaanus Liivak 2005–2009
Augenijus Vaškys 2009–2010
Andrus Renter 2010–2011
Ozell Wells 2011

Varis Krūmiņš 2011–2012
Tarmo Petter 2012
Sandis Buškevics 2012–2014
Varis Krūmiņš 2014–2016

Juris Umbraško 2016–2017
Kristaps Zeids 2017–2018
Armands Misus 2018
Mikhail Karpenko 2018–19
 Marko Zarkovič 2018–2019

Season by season

References

External links

Valga-Valka
Basketball teams established in 2001
2001 establishments in Estonia
Korvpalli Meistriliiga
Sport in Valga, Estonia